Irene Triplett (January 9, 1930May 31, 2020) was the last recipient of an American Civil War pension. Her father had fought for both the Confederacy and later the Union in the Civil War.

Life
Triplett was born in 1930 to Mose Triplett and Elida Hall. She was one of five children, of whom only she and her brother survived childhood. Her father, who had fought for both the Confederacy and the Union during the Civil War, was aged 78 when he married her mother; their union was Mose Triplett's second marriage. Irene Triplett grew up on her father's farm in Wilkes County, North Carolina. According to Triplett, she suffered a difficult childhood and was regularly beaten by both her parents and schoolteachers. Classmates teased her about her father whom they denounced as a "traitor".

Triplett's education ended at the sixth grade and, in 1943, she moved with her mother and brother to a poorhouse, where she remained until 1960. She later lived in private nursing homes until her death.

According to acquaintances, she was a regular user of chewing tobacco and was a fan of gospel music.

Pension
Since the death of her father in 1938, Triplett collected $73.13 per month from the Department of Veterans Affairs. She was eligible to inherit her father's pension due to cognitive impairments which she had, qualifying her as the helpless child of a veteran. The total amount she received was about $73,000, or $344,000 when adjusted for inflation.

Widespread public awareness of Triplett's status occurred in 2013 as the result of a Daily Mail story about her.

After the 2018 death of Fred Upham, the son of William H. Upham, she became the last surviving child of a Civil War veteran.

Death
Triplett died in 2020 at the Accordius Health nursing home in Wilkesboro, North Carolina, as a result of complications arising from a surgery.

See also
Helen Viola Jackson, the last living wife of a Civil War veteran who died on December 16, 2020.

References

External links

1930 births
2020 deaths
People from Wilkes County, North Carolina
20th-century American women
21st-century American women